General Ruangroj Mahasaranon (born 28 March 1946) is a retired Thai army officer. From 2005 to 2006 he was the Supreme Commander of the Headquarters of the Royal Thai Armed Forces. Following the 2006 Thailand coup d'état, ousted Prime Minister Thaksin Shinawatra attempted to put Ruangroj in power until Thaksin returned. However, Ruangroj was later named the Chief Advisor to the Council for Democratic Reform under Constitutional Monarchy (CDRM). In August 2006, Ruangroj visited junta leader Than Shwe in Myanmar, ostensibly to discuss border issues.

In August 2007, he surprised everyone – especially the junta – by his new political career as one of vice-leaders of People's Power Party.

References

Living people
Ruangroj Mahasaranon
Ruangroj Mahasaranon
Ruangroj Mahasaranon
1946 births